La Géode is a mirror-finished geodesic dome that holds an Omnimax theatre in Parc de la Villette at the Cité des Sciences et de l'Industrie (City of Science and Industry) in the 19th arrondissement of Paris, France.

The nearest Paris Métro stations to La Géode are Corentin Cariou on Line 7 and Porte de Pantin on Line 5.

Structure 
La Géode was designed by architect Adrien Fainsilber and engineer Gérard Chamayou. These triangles are 1.5 meters long and are fixed on a thin metal frame with the same triangular geodesic structure, consisting of 2,580 steel tube bars. The dome stands on a reinforced concrete base, which is attached to Cité des Sciences et de l'Industrie, the largest science museum in Europe. La Géode officially opened on May 6, 1985. After a similar venue located in La Défense closed in 2001, La Géode became the only spherical building in the Île-de-France region of France.

Before the name "Géode" was selected, other names were proposed, including humorous suggestions such as "Bouboule", "Irma", "Minouchette", "Double Zéro", and "Zézette".

Theatre 
The auditorium is fitted with a 12-point sound system with four large subwoofers that deliver 21,000 watts in surround sound designed by Cabasse. The IMAX films, presented in high definition and Géode 3D-relief, feature science, nature, and travel documentaries, short and long feature-length films, and high definition animated subjects. It also presents satellite concert events, including live broadcasts of the Metropolitan Opera from New York City.

See also 
 Parc de la Villette
 Cité des Sciences et de l'Industrie, City of Science and Industry, the largest science museum in Europe
 Cité de la musique, City of Music, an interactive museum of historical musical instruments and a concert hall
 Le Zénith, a concert arena in Parc de la Villette

References 
Notes

Bibliography
 Gérard Chamayou, La Géode, sa sphère miroir, in: Le Paris des Centraliens, pp. 98–102.
 Armelle Lavalou (2000), La Villette, Paris: Éditions du Patrimoine, 
 Jean Marie Pérouse de Montclos (1994), Le guide du Patrimoine: Paris, Ministère de la Culture, Paris: Hachette,

External links 

 La Géode, official site
 FromParis.com, Cité des Sciences, la Geode, panoramic photos of La Géode

Geodesic domes
Buildings and structures in the 19th arrondissement of Paris
Theatres completed in 1985
1985 establishments in France